County Road 510 or County Route 510 may refer to:

 County Road 510 (Indian River County, Florida)
 County Road 510 (Marquette County, Michigan)
 County Route 510 (New Jersey)